List of futsal clubs in Spain sorted by division:

Primera División 2012/13 season
Primera División clubs

Segunda División 2012/13 season
Segunda División clubs

Primera División Femenina 2012/13 season
Primera División Femenina clubs

See also
Futsal in Spain

External links
Liga Nacional de Fútbol Sala
Asociación Nacional de Clubes de Fútbol Sala Femenino

 
Futsal
Futsal